Paolo Branduani (born 9 March 1989) is an Italian footballer who plays as a goalkeeper for  club Crotone.

Career
A youth product of Internazionale, he had played for Inter's Giovanissimi Regionali B Team (2001–02 season) to "Primavera" reserve team in 2007–08 season. He was the 4th keeper of the reserve, behind Enrico Alfonso (left the club in January 2008), Vid Belec and Paolo Tornaghi that season.

In 2008–09 season, he left for Serie D club Colognese. In July 2009, he was signed by Serie B club AlbinoLeffe. At first he had to compete with Stefano Layeni and Daniel Offredi for the starting place, until Ivan Pelizzoli recovered from injury and became the first choice, while Layeni became the second keeper.

In July 2010, he left for FeralpiSalò in temporary deal along with Andrea Pianetti. The club purchased half of the registration rights of Branduani in summer 2011. Follow the relegation of AlbinoLeffe, the club bought back Branduani.

On 3 January 2013 he started to train with FeralpiSalò. On 8 January 2013 Stefano Chimini returned to AlbinoLeffe and left for Fersina Perginese, while Branduani moved to FeralpiSalò in -year contract.

On 23 January 2017 he signed for Teramo. On 30 March 2017 he left the club.

On 22 January 2020, he moved to Empoli.

On 31 August 2020 he became a new Catanzaro player.

On 24 June 2022, Branduani signed with Crotone for two years with an option for a third year.

Honours
SPAL
 Lega Pro: 2015–16 (Group B)
 Supercoppa di Serie C: 2016

Juve Stabia
 Serie C: 2018–19 (Group C)

References

External links
 
 Football.it Profile  
 AlbinoLeffe Profile (2009–10 season) 

1989 births
Living people
People from Vizzolo Predabissi
Footballers from Lombardy
Italian footballers
Association football goalkeepers
Serie B players
Serie C players
Lega Pro Seconda Divisione players
Serie D players
Inter Milan players
S.S.D. Pro Sesto players
U.C. AlbinoLeffe players
FeralpiSalò players
S.P.A.L. players
S.S. Teramo Calcio players
S.S. Juve Stabia players
Empoli F.C. players
U.S. Catanzaro 1929 players
F.C. Crotone players
Sportspeople from the Metropolitan City of Milan